Tjønnholsoksle is a mountain in Vågå Municipality in Innlandet county, Norway. The mountain is surrounded by several other notable mountains including Bukkehåmåren, Høgdebrotet, and Eggi to the northeast; Rasletinden to the southeast; Kalvehøgde to the south; Leirungskampen and Leirungstinden to the southwest; Skarvflytindene to the west; and Tjønnholstinden to the north.

See also
List of mountains of Norway by height

References

Jotunheimen
Vågå
Mountains of Innlandet